The 1956 International Cross Country Championships was held in Belfast, Northern Ireland, at the Royal Ulster Showground on 17 March 1956.  In addition, an unofficial women's championship was held the same day at Upminster, England on 17 March 1956. A report on the men's event as well as the women's event was given in the Glasgow Herald.

Complete results for men, and for women (unofficial), medallists, 
 and the results of British athletes were published.

Medallists

Individual Race Results

Men's (9 mi / 14.5 km)

Women's (1.9 mi / 3.0 km, unofficial)

Team Results

Men's

Women's (unofficial)

Participation

Men's
An unofficial count yields the participation of 70 male athletes from 8 countries.

 (8)
 (9)
 (9)
 (9)
 (8)
 (9)
 (9)
 (9)

Women's
An unofficial count yields the participation of 12 female athletes from 2 countries.

 (6)
 (6)

See also
 1956 in athletics (track and field)

References

International Cross Country Championships
International Cross Country Championships
International Cross Country Championships
International athletics competitions hosted by Northern Ireland
Cross country running in the United Kingdom
Sports competitions in Belfast
20th century in Belfast
March 1956 sports events in the United Kingdom